Yrjö Kiuru (25 July 1872, Antrea – 1 December 1945) was a Finnish farmer, schoolteacher, lay preacher and politician. He was a Member of the Parliament of Finland from 1911 to 1916, representing the Agrarian League.

References

1872 births
1945 deaths
People from Kamennogorsk
People from Viipuri Province (Grand Duchy of Finland)
Finnish Lutherans
Centre Party (Finland) politicians
Members of the Parliament of Finland (1911–13)
Members of the Parliament of Finland (1913–16)